Cesare Valinasso (November 27, 1909 in Turin – April 4, 1990 in Turin) was an Italian professional football player.

Honours
 Serie A champion: 1933/34, 1934/35.

1909 births
1990 deaths
Italian footballers
Serie A players
Reggina 1914 players
Juventus F.C. players
A.S. Roma players
Venezia F.C. players
Association football goalkeepers
A.S.D. La Biellese players

References